Rózsafa is a village in Baranya county, Hungary, a small region of Castle Island.

Populated places in Baranya County